The Colyaer Gannet S100 is a Spanish ultralight flying boat, designed and produced by Colyaer of Portonovo.

Design and development
The Gannet is an evolution of the Mascato S100 which was designed to comply with the Fédération Aéronautique Internationale microlight rules. It features a cantilever high-wing, a two-seats-in-side-by-side configuration enclosed cockpit, under a forward-hinged bubble canopy, wing-tip pontoons and a single engine in pusher configuration. As a true flying boat, it has no wheeled landing gear.

The Gannet is made entirely from carbon fibre, Kevlar and fibreglass composites. The long wingspan gives the aircraft a good glide ratio and allows power-off soaring flights.

An amphibious development became the Freedom S100.

Variants
Mascato S100
Gannet S100

Specifications (Mascato S100)

References

External links

2000s Spanish ultralight aircraft
Homebuilt aircraft
Single-engined pusher aircraft